Masjid-i Jahān-Numā (the 'World-reflecting Mosque'), commonly known as the Palayam Pally of Trivandrum, is the principal mosque of Trivandrum in Kerala, India. It is a Jama Masjid (Congregational Mosque).

The Juma Masjid, Palayam Mosque is the most important mosque in Thiruvananthapuram. In Palayam, the mosque has a temple and a Christian church as its neighbours, establishing the communal harmony of Keralites.

History
The history of the Palayam Mosque at Trivandrum dates back to 1813 AD, when the British Indian Second Regiment was stationed here. It was then constructed as a small mosque (Pattalappalli), with an open place for Eid prayers. In 1824 when the sixth regiment was posted here its officers bought up the land appointed a Qazi the Labba family which ended with Sheikh Mansoor Labba and entrusted the Muezzin the documents of the mosque. In 1848, when the sixteenth regiment came here its Jamadars and Havildars did considerable improvements to the mosque including the construction of a gate and arrangements for the maintenance and upkeep of the mosque building. When other regiments were stationed here, its officers brought about further changes and improvements. Thus the mosque is nearly 200 years old.

Later, in the 1960s, many philanthropic businessmen and government officials of Trivandrum took up its renovation and constructed the present-day Palayam Juma Masjid under the leadership of the Qazi and Imam Moulavi Sheikh Abul Hassan Ali Al-Noori. The Juma Masjid was inaugurated by the President of India Dr. Zakir Hussain in 1967. Sheikh Abul Hassan Ali Al-Noori (1921–2011), a freedom fighter, multilingual scholar and the first Imam of Palayam Juma Masjid who served here for close to two decades (1959–1979), helped elevate to its present-day status from a ‘pattalappalli’, during his tenure as Imam.

First Imam

Sheikh Abul Hassan Ali Al-Noori, the first elected Imam, was born in 1921 in Thenkassi. He was elected to serve after Sheikh Mansoor Labba who served as the Hanafi Imam for over 46 years. He had his schooling at Rajapalayam and graduation at Tanjavur. Left for Burma for post graduate studies and became a teacher in Rangoon. He was proficient in nine languages including Arabic, Urdu, Persian, Malay and Burmese. In 1942, he became active in the Quit India Movement in Uttar Pradesh and Delhi. He became an Imam in Thenkasi in 1952. From 1959 onwards, close to two decades, he was the Imam and Qazi at the Palayam Juma Masjid. The author of several books, a noted orator, social reformer and teacher, he entertained a progressive outlook, championing women's education, criticising the dowry system and promoting interest-free banking. 'Darul amaana' — an interest-free microfinance system in 1970 — launched under his guidance.

References

External links

Website - http://palayamjumamasjid.org/

Mosques in Kerala
Religious buildings and structures in Thiruvananthapuram
Religious buildings and structures in Thiruvananthapuram district
Palayam